Ancient Greek boxing ( pygmachia, "fist fighting") dates back to at least the 8th century BC (Homer's Iliad), and was practiced in a variety of social contexts in different Greek city-states. Most extant sources about ancient Greek boxing are fragmentary or legendary, making it difficult to reconstruct the rules, customs and history surrounding this activity in great detail. Still, it is clear that gloved boxing bouts were a significant part of ancient Greek athletic culture throughout the early classical period.

Origins
There is archeological and artistic evidence of ancient Greek boxing (πύξ - pyx or πυγμή - pygme in Αncient Greek) as early as the Minoan and Mycenaean periods. There are numerous legends about the origins of boxing in Greece. One legend holds that the heroic ruler Theseus invented a form of boxing in which two men sat face to face and beat each other with their fists until one of them was killed. In time, the boxers began to fight while standing and wearing gloves (with spikes) and wrappings on their arms below the elbows, but otherwise they fought naked.

According to the Iliad, Mycenaean warriors included boxing among their competitions honoring the fallen, though it is possible that the Homeric epics reflect later Greek culture. Boxing was among the contests held in memorial of Achilles' slain friend Patroclus, toward the end of the Trojan war. It was in commemoration of Patroclus that the Greeks later introduced boxing (pygme / pygmachia) to the Olympic Games in 688 BC. Participants trained on punching bags (called a korykos). Fighters wore leather straps (called himantes) over their hands (leaving the fingers free), wrists, and sometimes breast, to protect themselves from injury. There was no protection for the face or head, meaning Greek boxing was quite dangerous compared to modern day boxing. Women were prohibited to watch games, especially boxing. 

The scholar and historian Philostratus maintained that boxing was originally developed in Sparta. The early Spartans believed helmets were unnecessary and boxing prepared them for the inevitable blows to the head they would receive in battle. However, Spartans never participated in the competitive aspect of boxing, believing the means of defeat to be dishonorable.

Equipment

The style of protection utilized on the hands and knuckles could determine the style of fighting for the competitors. From the time of the Iliad until around 500 BC, himantes were used as protection for the knuckles and hand. The thongs usually had loops in which an athlete could insert four of his fingers and clench them together in a fist. Generally, this was the only form of protection worn by participants from the era of Homer until the end of the fifth century. Classical sources describe these as "soft gloves", though modern study has indicated that these thongs were far from soft and were protection for the knuckles, not to soften the blow to the opponent, much like modern padded gloves, which protect the hand, allowing for harder punches. They can be found on many vases excavated from the fifth and sixth century BC.

In around 400 BC sphairai were introduced. The sphairai were very similar to himantes. The only notable difference was that they contained a padded interior when wrapped around the hands and the exterior of the thong was notably more rigid and hard. In addition, "sharp thongs" were introduced during this time period to facilitate greater damage and remained popular up until around 200 AD.

Soon before the implementation of the sphairai, the oxys were introduced to boxing. They consisted of several thick leather bands encircling the hand, wrist, and forearm. A band of fleece was placed on the forearm to wipe away sweat. Leather braces extended up the forearm to give greater support when punching and the knuckles were reinforced with leather as well.

Korykos were the equivalent to modern punching bags. They were used for practice in the Palaestra and were filled with sand, flour, or millet. They were commonly depicted in art depicting boxing of the time.

Rules and characteristics

The currently accepted rules of ancient Greek boxing are based on historical references and images. Although there is some evidence of kicks in ancient Greek boxing, this is the subject of debate among scholars. Because of the few intact sources and references to the sport, the rules can only be inferred.
No holds or wrestling
Any type of blow with the hand was allowed but no gouging with the fingers
No ring was used
There were no rounds or time limits
Victory was decided when one fighter gave up or was incapacitated
No weight-classes, opponents were selected by chance
Judges enforced the rules by beating offenders with a switch or whip
Fighters could opt to exchange blows undefended if the fight lasted too long
Unlike modern boxing, the Greeks did not enclose the competitors in a ring to encourage fighting in close quarters. Therefore, most boxers fought defensively as opposed to offensively to encourage patience and caution. In addition, boxing in Ancient Greece was not divided into individual rounds. Competitors fought until finish, usually by surrender or mutual exhaustion. Felled boxers could be attacked without consequence, just as if they were standing.

While the practice of dividing boxers into weight classes is popular in the modern world, it was an unheard of practice for the Greeks. Typically, any man who wished to participate in the event was welcome to regardless of strength or muscle mass, and participants competed with each other through random drawings.

The precise rules of boxing in antiquity cannot be known for certain, and are thus inferred from historical references and images. It is believed that any type of blow with the hand was permitted, though using the hands to gouge at the eyeballs was not. Holding or wrestling one's opponent was also prohibited. If the fight lasted too long due to the tenacity of the competitors, the athletes could choose to exchange blows undefended to speed up the process. Judges probably enforced the rules by beating the offenders with a switch or a whip.

Ancient Olympic Champions
 Diagoras of Rhodes
 Theagenes of Thasos
 Kleitomachos (athlete)
 Melankomas
 Varazdat of Armenia
 Onomastus of Smyrna
 Agesarchus of Tritaea
 Pythagoras (boxer)
 Glaucus of Carystus
 Aurelios Zopyros
 Damarchus
 Atyanas
 Horus (athlete)
 Theotimus, an Eleian boxer. A statue at Olympia was made to honour him. His father, Moschion, accompanied Alexander the Great in his campaign to Asia.

See also 
 Pankration
 Boxing glove
 Modern boxing
 Boxing
 History of physical training and fitness

References

External links 
 A Dictionary of Greek and Roman Antiquities (1890)

8th-century BC establishments in Greece
Boxing
Historical European martial arts
Combat sports
Obsolete blood sports